The Lady of The Aroostook is a novel written by William Dean Howells in 1879. It was published in Cambridge, Massachusetts by H. O. Houghton and Company.

Plot summary

In South Bradfield, Massachusetts, Lydia Blood lives with her Aunt Maria and her grandfather Deacon Latham on their family farm. Both of Lydia's parents had died of illness when Lydia was young and she is now, at the age of nineteen, being sent to live with her other aunt, on her father's side of the family, Aunt Josephine, in Venice, Italy. Lydia was not only blessed with good looks and good smarts, but she also was blessed with a beautiful singing voice which she is going to cultivate in Venice and attempt to make a career out of. Her Aunt Josephine wrote to her grandfather suggesting that Lydia should come to Venice to live with her. She also suggested that he should go to Boston to find a ship to bring Lydia to Europe, which is how he found Captain Jenness and the Aroostook. Lydia and her grandfather travel to Boston where the Aroostook, a large and beautiful ship, awaits to take Lydia and several other passengers to Trieste. While looking for the wharf that the Aroostook is anchored at, Lydia and her grandfather become lost and decide to rest for a minute. During their rest they encounter two men who ask if Lydia is all right because she looks very pale and distraught. Her grandfather ensures the men that she is just tired from traveling and they leave. Lydia is angered that they would ask this question because she felt that they did not have the right to ask such a question.

Finally the captain of the Aroostook, Captain Jenness, finds Lydia and her grandfather and shows them to the ship. Captain Jenness is a warm and confident man and he assures Lydia that she will be right at home on the Aroostook being that he has two daughters of his own who travel with him quite a lot. Lydia leaves her grandfather and boards the ship. Her room is the stateroom on the ship, the largest and most elegant room that Captain Jenness had designed for his wife. Lydia then meets a young boy named Thomas who brings Lydia's things to her room. Thomas is the steward on the Aroostook and he tells Lydia that Captain Jenness and his crew are first rate. He is very excited and amused by Lydia and her possessions, especially her beautiful black silk dress. Lydia tells Thomas that her Aunt Maria makes all of Lydia's dresses and that she has a real gift for it. Lydia then tells Thomas that she was a teacher in South Bradfield, which Thomas finds wildly interesting because of Lydia's young age. Thomas shows Lydia around the Aroostook and then to the kitchen. Lydia is in dismay when she sees that the cook, named Gabriel, is not a woman because this means that Lydia will be on the only woman on board the ship. 
Deacon Latham returns to Aunt Maria in South Bradfield and tells her that everything went well and that Lydia is safely aboard the Aroostook. He then tells Maria that she will be the only woman on the ship. Maria drops the food that she had in her hand in horror. She is worried that Lydia will have no one to talk to and relate to during the journey. Passing outside is Minister Goodlow and Maria calls him in to tell him of Lydia being the only woman aboard the ship. Both Minister Goodlow and Deacon Latham successfully reassure Maria that Lydia will be fine on her journey.

Lydia is introduced to the first officer Mr. Watterson and then sees the other passengers who will be traveling with her. She immediately recognizes two of them to be the two men who had asked if she was all right previously on the docks in Boston. The two men are Mr. James Staniford and Mr. Charles Dunham. The third man Lydia does not recognize; his name is Mr. Hicks. Staniford and Dunham are both well to do men from New England who are in their late twenties. Mr. Hicks is also a young man but he does not look well when Lydia sees him. Captain Jenness explains that Hicks is a drunk and he is aboard the ship trying to straighten himself up. Dunham and Staniford, once in their room, show some disgust that Lydia is such a young girl yet she is being treated so well already. They also look down on Hicks and treat him as if he is of a lower class. Staniford and Dunham are very interested in knowing more about Lydia and they want to make sure that she feels comfortable on the ship after finding out that she will be the only woman on board, they even comment on her unmistakable beauty to each other.  However, they do not think too highly of Lydia because of where she is from in Massachusetts.

Staniford is traveling to Europe because of his “irresolute mood” and he believes that “Europe is the place for American irresolution.”  Staniford wants to move to California or Colorado when he returns. He has a great deal of money but due to a bad business venture has lost much of it. He has many talents, but he wants to turn to the land and operate a farm in the West. Dunham is traveling to Europe to see a somewhat long lost love of his, Miss. Hibbard. Dunham had proposed to Miss Hibbard but she had declined and left for Europe. A few weeks later she wrote to Dunham asking for him to take her back and marry. Both Staniford and Dunham are still in wonder as to why Lydia is on the ship. They think that Lydia lives in a boring town where nothing exciting ever happens, so what could have possibly occurred to force her to travel to Europe at such a young age? After having some conversation with Lydia they are both confused and amused as to how Lydia is so proper and intelligent.

Staniford is a snobbish man and he is very curious to hear what Lydia is like. He looks down on her in amusement and he urges Dunham to interact with Lydia so he can study her. Staniford thinks that Lydia has never interacted with a man before and that Dunham's arm was the first that she had ever held. He believes that her style is of her own creation and that it is by luck that she is able to create it on her own. Dunham has the ship's carpenter make an area for shuffleboard so that he and Lydia can play. Hicks decides to join in as well while Staniford sits on the side and observes. Staniford feels pity for Lydia when she treats Hicks like a gentleman; she really is truly innocent and inexperienced. Staniford feels the need to study and classify all of the people that he meets. Lydia is still unclassified to him so she fascinates him. He believes that she is book smart but lacks common sense because of her sheltered life in South Bradfield.

After a week Staniford finally decides to talk to Lydia one on one. He is somewhat patronizing and he asks Lydia leading questions, which make her feel like a lesser person. Lydia tells him her life story and soon Staniford, who always had a way with women, finds himself to be flirting with her. Staniford feels that he must protect Lydia's “helpless loneliness.”  
 
On Sunday Staniford, not a very religious man, pokes fun that the crew are going to be eating a late breakfast because they are attended a church service that Dunham is performing. At the end of the service the group sings and upon hearing Lydia's beautiful voice the crew is stunned. Staniford, of course, is also fascinated by Lydia's voice and begins to think that is the reason as to why she is traveling to Europe. Dunham tells Lydia that he is going to organize a sort of a musical where Lydia can sing. After the service Staniford makes more off color remarks about religion that offend the crew and Dunham in particular. An argument later ensues at dinner about religion and Staniford purposely goes after Dunham. Dinner ends short with the crew very upset with Staniford. Later that evening Staniford and Lydia walk together on the deck. Lydia tells him that she has not encountered many men in her father and Staniford finds it amusing that she is being subordinate to him even though she is an authority figure herself as a school teacher. Lydia tells Staniford that she thinks that he is making fun of everyone and that he feels as if he is better than them. Staniford angrily demands to know why and Lydia, realizing that she now has the upper hand, says that she might tell him in Venice. Staniford retorts and says that they will not meet in Venice because he knows that an older man of his place in society cannot be seen with a younger woman like Lydia. Instead of directly telling this to Lydia he simply says that they will both be too busy and will not have an opportunity to meet up again. The two speak of Lydia's voice and what she wants to do when she arrives in Venice. Staniford is still flirting with the Lydia by the end of their walk and he takes her hand and begins to bring it to his lips. Lydia helplessly allows him to do so, but he stops abruptly and says goodnight.

Staniford thinks to himself how he almost came to kiss her hand and then he thinks that Hicks, in this matter, is a better man for not have making any advances towards Lydia. The next morning Staniford is anxious to see Lydia and to read her body language. However, Lydia does not come to breakfast on account of a bad headache. Staniford lurks around the ship for the rest of the day until dinner, which Lydia attends on account of Hicks bringing her some guava jelly and making her feel better. After dinner Staniford apologizes to Dunham for his rude comments about religion the night before. Dunham accepts his apology and begins to talk to Staniford about how he finds it interesting that Lydia has become of prime importance to all of the men. Dunham, unaware of Staniford's encounter with Lydia the night before, tells Staniford that he should get to know Lydia just as the rest of the men have. Staniford becomes defensive and accuses Dunham of having sexual relations with him. Dunham assures Staniford that he has not, but he is worried that Lydia may think that Dunham has generated feelings for her. Dunham asks Staniford to spend more time with Lydia in order to show her that his attention to her was out of kindness and nothing more. Staniford, shrewdly, replies that he does not know how to interact with a girl like Lydia and that Dunham must pay the penalty for his kindness and generosity. Later that evening, Staniford sees Lydia walking with Hicks around the deck just as he had done the night before. Lydia is laughing more freely than ever, which angers Staniford.

The next day Lydia and Hicks sing and play music together much to both Staniford and Dunham's disappointment. Staniford tells Dunham of his plans to move out West once they return and to also live the bachelor life. A few days later Lydia and Hicks put on a concert to all of the crew's delight; Hicks is beginning to be seen in a more honorable light now that he is sober. After the concert Staniford tells Lydia that she must not forget about the little people from the Aroostook once she is a famous singer. Lydia does not answer and Staniford angrily tells her that he envies her ability to snub people with her silence. Lydia tells him that she does not know what he means and Staniford, struggling to find the right words, tells her that he is upset that she will not walk with him anymore. Lydia says that he has not asked her since the night that he tried to kiss her hand. Lydia then tells Staniford that she believes that Dunham has lost interest in her and her music. This makes Staniford feel much better knowing that Lydia has lost some interest for Dunham and the two begin to walk together again.

The next day the first mate, Mr. Watterson, approaches Staniford and tells him that he does not like Hicks and that he believes that Hicks, once ashore, will be right back to drinking. He infers to Staniford that he ought to spend more time with Lydia in order to keep her away from Hicks. Lydia comes up on deck to look for a lost kerchief and Staniford asks her if she has come to walk with again. Lydia angrily asks why Staniford would think that and Staniford, quickly covering his tracks, says that it was more of a hope that she would want to walk with him and not really a question. Lydia is slightly embarrassed and apologetic and does indeed walk with Staniford. Staniford and Lydia begin to talk romantically and flirt just as they had done before and Staniford conveys to Lydia that he does not like her spending time with Hicks because he is a shabby man and he is not to be valued. As their talk continues Staniford cannot help himself from thinking about making to love to Lydia but seeing that it is almost midnight he sends her off to bed. Staniford then confronts Hicks and tells him that Lydia has no interest in either of them so he ought to leave her alone.

As the weather changes and worsens so does Staniford; he hardens his heart and makes no attempts to speak with Lydia, much to her surprise. The storm arrives and makes Staniford very sick; he does not come out of his room until the ship arrives at Gibraltar. All of the crew, including Captain Jenness, Lydia and Hicks, leave to go to Gibraltar but Staniford and Dunham stay on board. Staniford tells Dunham that he is ashamed of himself for having recently cold to Lydia because it has caused her to take refuge once more with Hicks. The crew comes back with all but Hicks. Dunham admits that he lent Hicks five dollars and Staniford is furious. He tells Dunham that Hicks is no doubt passed out drunk somewhere in Gibraltar. Right before Captain Jenness is set to sail Hicks arrives back on board. He is sober and he immediately repays his debt to Dunham. The next morning Hicks misses breakfast but appears at dinner noticeably drunk. Dunham takes Thomas and Lydia on deck for dessert and Staniford then threatens to hit Hicks. Before the crew can grab Hicks and take him back to his bed he makes his way on deck but he sits away from the others. Eventually he begins to talk to Lydia and Staniford tells him to leave her alone and to go to bed. Hicks challenges Staniford to a fight and Lydia, never having seen a man so drunk, begins to cry. Hicks swings and Staniford but his lack of balance sends him overboard. Staniford jumps in after him and the crew lowers a life boat and saves the two men; Lydia is angered by the events and locks herself in her room.

Captain Jenness tells Hicks that once they arrive in Messina he must leave the Aroostook and never return. From that point forward, Lydia keeps to herself and looks at Hicks and Staniford in disgust. When the ship arrives at Messina Staniford, out of kindness, offers some money to Hicks so that he can get himself back to Boston. Hicks takes the money and leaves the ship; Staniford feels that Hicks’ absence is worth twice the amount that he lent him. Staniford and Dunham decide to stay at a hotel in Messina while the Captain makes some repairs to the ship. Staniford is upset and does not understand why Lydia is mad at him instead of being congratulatory. He feels as if Lydia has begun to develop from an innocent girl into a mature woman because of the incident. Lydia had been a wilding rose bud in South Bradfield, now she was blossoming into a flower.   Staniford meets another woman in Messina and spends some time with her, but he is longing for Lydia the entire time. Once back on board the Aroostook, Lydia tells Staniford that she feels as if she has died and South Bradfield is earth and Venice is Heaven. The trip on the Aroostook is the journey between the two.

Lydia tells Staniford that she pitied Hicks and she then praises Staniford for saving his life. Staniford proclaims to Lydia that he depends on her opinion of him for his peace of mind; Lydia, uncomfortably, does not know what to say and she abruptly leaves. Staniford, much to Dunham's disbelief, tells Dunham that he is in love with Lydia. Dunham cannot believe this because of their “inequalities” and Lydia's overall innocence.   Dunham tells Staniford that he must wait until they see Lydia in Venice to tell her of his feelings, mainly because Lydia may feel the same but she has not realized Staniford's feelings yet.

As the days go on Staniford and Lydia draw nearer and nearer and make their planes to meet up in Venice. Staniford tells her that he living for the day that they can reunite in Venice. The Aroostook finally arrives in Trieste on a Friday and the crew takes the passengers’ baggage to a hotel. They all have their last meal together on the Aroostook that night. Staniford and Dunham leave before Lydia and she looks at Staniford with trust but a troubled wonder as well.   Later that evening, Staniford feels regret for not having told Lydia of his true feelings. He and Dunham go to one of the boats that will be leaving for Venice in an attempt to look for Lydia. Dunham goes aboard one of the ships but falls and hits his head, severely concussing himself. Staniford needs to watch over Dunham and he writes a letter to Lydia telling her of Dunham's fall and also that he will be a few days late to Venice.

Lydia meets her Uncle Henshaw Erwin when she leaves the Aroostook. Henshaw is a tall, slender English man in his late fifties. He arrives with a maid named Veronica who is there to care for Lydia. Lydia finds this odd because she believes that she can take of herself. Henshaw is fascinated with Americans and likes to take notes about certain idioms that they use. During the entire trip to Venice he asks Lydia questions about America and about which phrases she commonly uses. They arrive in Venice at her aunt and uncle's house; it is a large home right on one of the canals in Venice. Lydia's room is lavish and large but she cannot help from crying and longing to be back in her room on the Aroostook.

Lydia's aunt and uncle try their best to make her feel at home; Henshaw attempts to use American phrases to compliment and cheer her up. On Sunday morning, Aunt Josephine takes Lydia to church and lends her a bonnet so that she will fit in with the other girls who are attending. At the end of the sermon Lydia sings with the others and many curious heads turn to look once they hear her beautiful voice. After the sermon, an elderly woman named Lady Fenleigh asks Josephine if she will bring Lydia to her palace to sing. Josephine is thrilled that Lady Fenleigh likes Lydia because she thought that many of the other churchgoers would be envious of Lydia's beautiful voice. Later that afternoon a talented English artist, Mr. Rose-Black, stops by to see Josephine. He tells her that everybody at church was “enchanted” by Lydia's voice and he also asks if he can sketch Lydia; he is intrigued by not only her voice but also her beauty.   Several more guests arrive to see Josephine, but Lydia is very quiet and reserved. Later that evening, Josephine tells Henshaw that Lydia is terribly unresponsive and reserved and that it is hard to realize that Lydia is a simple village girl because her air, style and self-possession.

The next morning Josephine invites Lydia to her room for breakfast and tells her that Venice was only suitable climate for her health and that it took her a while to become accustomed to the English and Italian customs. Josephine continues to tell Lydia that she despise the English women in Italy, but by showing them that an American can be European than they are thrills her. She tells Lydia that she must reverse her American ideals in order to become as dull as the Europeans and that it will not be hard for her because of her innocence. Lydia then tells Josephine about her journey on the Aroostook and Josephine is appalled to hear that Lydia was the only woman on board. Lydia retorts that every man on the ship treated her with the utmost respect and that they are nicer and better that any of the people that she has met so far in Italy. She then realizes that Staniford had spent quite a considerable amount of time in Europe and that he could very well be just like the rest of them. This causes Lydia to doubt that Staniford ever had any true feelings for her and she begins to weep. Lydia tells Josephine about Staniford and about how he made her fall in love with him. Josephine listens and tells her that she knows of Staniford and his family and that a man like him could not have really loved Lydia, he was only flirting and being nice. Lydia tells Josephine that she believes that Staniford loves her and that he is coming to Venice later that day to see her. Josephine tells Henshaw about Lydia and Staniford and Henshaw is very reassuring saying that American men are more reserved and polite and that there is nothing to worry about. Henshaw says that Staniford is clearly coming to profess his love and to propose to Lydia. Lydia goes with Henshaw to row on the canals while Josephine stays behind to wait for Staniford. Staniford, however, never arrives and Lydia is embarrassed and upset.

Dunham later wakes from his daze and is upset and ashamed of himself because he has caused Staniford to be late to Venice. Staniford assures him that it is alright because he wrote a letter to Lydia telling her of what happened. A porter then brings Staniford some letters and he fumbles through them; he realizes that the porter had accidentally brought back the letter that was intended for Lydia. Horrified, Staniford quickly arranges for Captain Jenness to take care of Dunham while he makes plans to take the next train to Venice. When Staniford arrives at the Erwin's home in Venice, Josephine is thrilled to see him and sends Lydia down to greet him.

Staniford sees Lydia and it is a dream come true for him. Staniford immediately professes his love for her and Lydia tells him that she also loves him but she does not know if she can forgive him for leaving her hanging out to dry for so long. Staniford explains to Lydia what happened with Dunham and why his letter was never sent. This comforts Lydia a great deal but she still has concerns about what people will say about the two of them being together. Staniford assures her that he is deeply in love with her and that it does not matter what others think. Lydia finally admits to Staniford that he is a good man and Staniford responds by saying, “I'll keep that praise till I’ve earned it.”

Six weeks later, Staniford and Lydia are married in the Campo Santi Apostoli Church in Venice. Dunham, Miss. Hibbard and Captain Jenness all come for the wedding. Jenness invites Staniford and Lydia to spend their honeymoon on the Aroostook; they respectfully decline because Staniford would surely become seasick again. The newly wed Mr. and Mrs. Staniford spend some time with Josephine and Henshaw in Venice and then the four of them leave for California. Staniford buys a ranch to work on and Josephine finds the climate of Santa Barbara easy to adapt to. After a few months, Staniford and Lydia travel to South Bradfield where they meet with Maria and Deacon Latham and other old friends of Lydia's.

Character list

 Lydia Blood: Lydia begins the story as a young nineteen-year-old, innocent girl from the small town of South Bradfield. She is gifted with beauty and an astonishing singing voice. She is traveling to Venice aboard the Aroostook in order to live with her Aunt and Uncle and to cultivate her voice. Both of her parents died when she was very young and she moved to live with her Aunt Maria and her grandfather Deacon Latham on their farm in South Bradfield, Massachusetts. Throughout her journey on the Aroostook, Lydia falls in love with her shipmate, James Staniford, and she encounters the passage of innocence to experience.
 James Staniford: James Staniford is a wealthy man in his late twenties from Boston who is traveling on the Aroostook with his friend Charles Dunham. Staniford lost a great deal of his money through a bad business venture and he is traveling to Europe in order to relieve his woes. Staniford is determined to live the life of a bachelor but during his journey on the Aroostook he falls in love with Lydia Blood. Staniford becomes the type of man that he had once made fun of, but it is for the better.
 Charles Dunham: Charles Dunham is traveling to Europe to reunite with his lost love, Miss. Hibbard. He had proposed to Miss. Hibbard but she had denied his request and left for Europe. While in Europe she wrote for him to come find her and to marry her. Dunham is a kind man who is very generous to Lydia and he makes her feel at home on the Aroostook.
 Captain Jenness: Captain Jenness is the Captain of the Aroostook. He is gentle but confident man and he makes sure that Lydia is comfortable during her trip on the Aroostook. Jenness has a wife and two daughters who are close to Lydia's age.
 Mr. Hicks: Hicks is a drunk who is traveling on the Aroostook in order to cure himself. He had once been studying to become a doctor but his alcoholism prevented him from doing so. During the trip Hicks falters and becomes drunk one night, Captain Jenness is forced to kick him off of the Aroostook.
 Aunt Maria: Lydia's mother's sister who cares for her after Lydia's parents die. She has a great talent for dress making and she prepares all of Lydia's outfits.
 Deacon Latham: Deacon Latham is Lydia's grandfather. He lives with Maria on their farm in South Bradfield. He is a spritely man for his age and he is the one who found Captain Jenness and the Aroostook. He accompanies Lydia during her journey to Boston.
 Aunt Josephine: Josephine is Lydia's father's sister. She moved to Venice because it was the only climate that suited her health needs. She appears to be completely transformed by her years of living and Europe, but at heart she is truly an American.
 Uncle Henshaw: Henshaw is married to Josephine and he is an Englishman. He is fascinated by Americans and the certain idioms and phrases that they use

Themes

The Lady of the Aroostook is a novel about the passage of innocence to experience for a young girl and also about the breaking of old customs and traditions. At the beginning of the novel Lydia is a young innocent girl who has had little to no interactions with men. Throughout her journey on the Aroostook and her interactions with Staniford in particular, she begins to fall in love and pass from an innocent young girl to an experience mature woman. The love between Lydia and Staniford is considered to be very taboo at the time, not only because of how they came to be in love, during a journey in which Lydia was the only female on board the ship, but also because of the difference in their age and their status in society. The love and the bond between them breaks the previous barriers that had been set up by outdated customs and traditions.

Critical reception

The Publishers' Weekly published on February 15, 1879, wrote about the upcoming book, The Lady of The Aroostook by William Dean Howells. They wrote that few readers think it will be his best work, but nevertheless Howells is a wonderful writer and "anyone who fails to read this, or any of Mr. Howells' stories, misses a great pleasure."

Other

William Dean Howells was published by H.O. Houghton and Company. Houghton was the cofounder of Houghton Mifflin and was also mayor of Cambridge, Massachusetts; the city where he published Howells’ novel.   Howells had a tenure as a writer for and an editor for the Atlantic Monthly.   He published The Lady of the Aroostook over a period of twelve months in the Atlantic Monthly.

References

External links

1879 American novels
Works by William Dean Howells